Steffan Hughes (born 17 February 1994) is a Welsh rugby union player who plays for the Dragons regional team as a centre. Hughes previously played for the Scarlets regional team. He is a Wales under-20 international and previously captained the side.

Hughes made his debut for the Scarlets regional team in 2014 having previously played for the Scarlets academy.

Following the 2021–2022 season, Hughes was released by the Scarlets, and subsequently joined Dragons RFC on a short term deal as injury cover.

References

External links 
Scarlets Player Profile

Welsh rugby union players
Scarlets players
Living people
1994 births
Rugby union centres
Rugby union players from Llanelli
Dragons RFC players